The common silver-biddy (Gerres oyena), also known as the blacktip silver biddy, Darnley Island silverbelly, longtail silverbiddy, oceanic silver biddy, shining silver-belly or slender silver belly, is a species of mojarra native to marine and brackish waters of coastal waters of the Indian Ocean and the western Pacific Ocean. It inhabits estuaries, coastal waters and lagoons. This species is important to local commercial fisheries.

Reproduction
Based on the seasonal reproductive cycle of the species, ovary development of the females occurs from March to September, while the testes development of the males occurs between March and August.  For both sexes, the maximal development occurs during April and May.  Using the gonadosomatic index, the minimum standard length (SL) at sexual maturity was 89.7 mm for the females and 81.4 mm for males.  The size at which 50% of individuals were sexually mature was 104 mm SL in females and 92 mm SL in males.

See also
Japanese silver-biddy

References

External links
 Photograph
 

Common silver-biddy
Fish of Japan
Fish described in 1775